Quezon, officially the Municipality of Quezon, is a 4th class municipality in the province of Nueva Vizcaya, Philippines. According to the 2020 census, it has a population of 24,055 people.

History
The municipality of Quezon was created on 18 June 1961 from Solano by virtue of Republic Act No. 3427. Based on the order assigned to the Commission on Elections, referred to as Case No. 405, dated 7 March 1963, the people of Quezon participated in the 12 November 1963 plebiscite and elected its Municipal District Mayor and Municipal District Members. Five years later, Quezon became a full-fledged municipality of Nueva Vizcaya. The original barangays that composed the municipality at that time of its creation were Baresbes, Caliat, Buliwao, Darubba, Maddiangat, and Nalubbanan. On 12 November 1967, Barangays Maasin, Calaocan, Bonifacio, Aurora and Runruno were created. The last barangay created was Brgy. Dagupan in 1979.

Geography

Barangays
Quezon is politically subdivided into 12 barangays. These barangays are headed by elected officials: Barangay Captain, Barangay Council, whose members are called Barangay Councilors. All are elected every three years.

 Aurora
 Baresbes
 Buliwao
 Bonifacio
 Calaocan
 Caliat 
 Darubba
 Maddiangat
 Nalubbunan
 Runruno
 Maasin
 Dagupan

Climate

Demographics

In the 2020 census, Quezon had a population of 24,055.

Economy

Government
Quezon, belonging to the lone congressional district of the province of Nueva Vizcaya, is governed by a mayor designated as its local chief executive and by a municipal council as its legislative body in accordance with the Local Government Code. The mayor, vice mayor, and the councilors are elected directly by the people through an election which is being held every three years.

Elected officials

Education
The Schools Division of Nueva Vizcaya governs the town's public education system. The division office is a field office of the DepEd in Cagayan Valley region. The office governs the public and private elementary and public and private high schools throughout the municipality.

References

External links

[ Philippine Standard Geographic Code]
Philippine Census Information
Local Governance Performance Management System

Municipalities of Nueva Vizcaya